The Osmussaar earthquake occurred on 25 October 1976 near the north tip of Osmussaar, an island close to the coast of Estonia. The earthquake was largely felt in surrounding areas like north Estonia, south Finland and Sweden. Aftershocks also took place in November.

Damage
The earthquake was the most powerful recorded in Estonia; it caused rockfalls along the north and northeastern coasts, and some houses suffered some structural damage.

See also

List of earthquakes in 1976
Geology of Estonia

References

1976 earthquakes
Earthquakes in Estonia
1976 in Estonia
Lääne-Nigula Parish
Earthquakes in the Soviet Union